Walter Fritzsche (19 December 1895 in Berlin-Steglitz – 1956) was a German international footballer.

References

1895 births
1956 deaths
Association football defenders
German footballers
Germany international footballers
People from Berlin
People from Steglitz-Zehlendorf